The Type 14 Blackwood class were a ship class of minimal "second-rate" anti-submarine warfare frigates.  Built for the Royal Navy during the 1950s at a time of increasing threat from the Soviet Union's submarine fleet, they served until the late 1970s.  Twelve ships of this class served with the Royal Navy and a further three were built for the Indian Navy.

Design

The Type 14 frigates were designed to be cheaper and smaller than the expensive Type 12 frigates. Although they lacked gun armament, their anti-submarine armament of two Limbo mortars, Mk 20 torpedoes and sonar fit equalled the larger Type 12, and as the crews of the Type 14 concentrated almost entirely on practising anti-submarine warfare, they were often the most effective frigates in anti-submarine exercises until the mid 1960s. The class were entirely specialised for the anti-submarine role and hence had little capability in any other, though they did perform fishery protection duties during the confrontations with Iceland over fishing rights.

In the late 1950s, during their time on patrols around Iceland to ensure that Iceland did not interfere with British fishermen's attempts to fish, problems were found with the hulls of the Type 14s in such heavy waters, so that their hulls had to be strengthened to cope with these patrols.  However, they proved to be good sea boats throughout the dispute, which continued into the mid-1970s. The low profile of the superstructure was a deliberate design feature to confuse enemy attackers. The Type 14 design was flawed by the lack of a gun, and also by general lack of space.  After experience with these frigates, the Admiralty decided that quality was the top priority of all ships, even though it meant having a smaller fleet.

One of the ships, Exmouth, was later converted 1966–1968 to act as experimental trials vessel for gas turbine propulsion, becoming the first major warship of the Royal Navy to be entirely powered by gas turbines.  In this configuration she was easily distinguishable from other members of the class due to her larger (non-cylindrical, streamlined) funnel and large air intakes sited immediately fore and aft of the funnel.  The success of these trials led to the adoption of all-gas turbine propulsion as standard on subsequent Royal Navy warship designs (Type 21 & 22 Frigates, Type 42 destroyers, 'Invincible' class carriers).

Service
The Type 14s' limited size, at just , restricted them from operating past the 1970s as anti-submarine ships. Their small hull limited the extent of modifications and upgrades possible, preventing the Type 14s from being armed with more effective weapons, effectively rendering them obsolete. All were decommissioned in the 1970s. The last operational were the gas powered Exmouth in 1977 and Hardy which attended the Silver Jubilee of Elizabeth II in 1977 and deployed again from the standby squadron in 1978.

In film
The 1960 Norman Wisdom film The Bulldog Breed was made in Portland harbour with co-operation from the Royal Navy, and features several of the Blackwood-class frigates.
The 1958 British comedy "Further Up The Creek" features the fictional HMS Aristotle, a type 14 frigate.
HMS Pellew (F62) appeared in 1961 British monster movie "Gorgo". HMS Dundas appeared in the Ava Gardner film The Little Hut in 1957.

Ships

Royal Navy
The Royal Navy ships were all named after British captains. Many had been in the Napoleonic wars and some were present at the Battle of Trafalgar.

  – Henry Blackwood
  – Adam Duncan
  – James Whitley Deans Dundas
  – Edward Pellew, 1st Viscount Exmouth
  – Henry FitzRoy, 1st Duke of Grafton
  –  Thomas Hardy
  – Augustus Keppel
  – Pulteney Malcolm
  – George Murray
  – Hugh Palliser
  – Israel Pellew
  – Thomas McNamara Russell

Indian Navy

Three ships were built for the Indian Navy in the late 1950s

 , sunk by the Pakistani submarine PNS Hangor on 8 December 1971 during the Indo-Pakistani War of 1971

Construction programme

Footnotes

Publications
 Purvis, M.K., 'Post War RN Frigate and Guided Missile Destroyer Design 1944–1969',  Transactions,  Royal Institution of Naval Architects (RINA), 1974
 Marriott, Leo, 'Royal Navy Frigates Since 1945', Second Edition, Published by Ian Allan Ltd (Surrey, UK), 1990
 

 
Frigate classes
Ship classes of the Royal Navy